Decisive Battles of the American Civil War Volume 1: Bull Run to Chancellorsville is a computer wargame developed by Roger Keating and Ian Trout and published by Strategic Studies Group in 1988 for the Commodore 64 and Apple II. Two sequels were released in 1988: Volume 2: Gaines Mill to Chattanooga and Volume 3: Wilderness to Nashville.

Plot
Bull Run to Chancellorsville is a tactical wargame that offers the player the opportunity to command the first battles of the American Civil War. Six Civil War battles are included in Volume I. Two players may manage either the Confederate or Union army, with play also governed by applying one of three handicap levels to each side, or a single player can request that the computer manage either army.

Gameplay
Bull Run to Chancellorsville is completely menu-driven, broken down into command subsets. The developers also include with the software two Game and Design Menus plus full-color maps of the various battlefields. Also included with each SSG game are Warpaint and Warplan, programs that allow the player to design tactical wargames.

Development
Roger Keating and Ian Trout of Strategic Studies Group developed this game as the first release in their Decisive Battles series.

Reception
The game was reviewed in 1988 in Dragon #135 by Hartley, Patricia, and Kirk Lesser in "The Role of Computers" column. The reviewers gave the game 4 out of 5 stars. Regan Carey and Mike Salata reviewed the game for Computer Gaming World, and stated that "Decisive Battles of the Civil War is a step up the ladder in the evolution of SSG game systems. Features like Warplan and Warpaint set it apart from most competitors."

In 1990 Computer Gaming World gave the game three-plus out of five stars, and in 1993 three stars.

Reviews
Commodore Computing International - Feb, 1989

References

External links

American Civil War: Volume One at GameSpot
Review in Compute!

1988 video games
American Civil War video games
Apple II games
Commodore 64 games
Computer wargames
DOS games
Multiplayer and single-player video games
Strategic Studies Group games
Video games developed in Australia